The 1905 Open Championship was the 45th Open Championship, held 7–9 June at the Old Course at St Andrews, Fife, Scotland. James Braid won the Championship for the second time, five strokes ahead of runners-up Rowland Jones and John Henry Taylor.

All entries played 18 holes on the first two days; those within fourteen strokes of the lead made the cut for the final two rounds on Friday.

Strong winds and hard ground conditions made scoring difficult on all three days, with few rounds under 80. Sandy Herd, Taylor, Walter Toogood, and Harry Vardon co-led after the first round at 80. Scoring improved slightly on Thursday and Jones' 77 put him in the lead with 158; he was followed by Braid on 159 and James Kinnell and Arnaud Massy on 161. Just 45 players made the cut at 172 and better, including a sole amateur John Graham Jr.

In the third round on Friday morning, Braid's 78 extended his lead to six shots over Kinnell, Massy, and Taylor. Jones took 87 and dropped eight strokes behind Braid. Scoring 81 in the afternoon, Braid was never challenged; he reached the turn in 38 and despite taking six at the 15th and 16th holes, came back in 43. A 78 moved Jones up to a second place tie with Taylor, five strokes behind the champion.

Past champions in the field 

Source:

Did not enter: John Ball (1890).

Round summaries

First round
Wednesday, 7 June 1905

Source:

Second round
Thursday, 8 June 1905

Source:

Third round
Friday, 9 June 1905 (morning)

Source:

Final round
Friday, 9 June 1905 (afternoon)

Source:

References

External links
St Andrews 1905 (Official site)

The Open Championship
Golf tournaments in Scotland
Open Championship
Open Championship
Open Championship